Farzoul is a village in Djelfa Province, Algeria, east of Hassi Bahbah.

Populated places in Djelfa Province